Joseph Hill may refer to:
 Joseph Hill (lexicographer) (1625–1707), English clergyman, academic and lexicographer
 Joseph Hill (violin maker) (1715–1784), British violin maker
 Joseph Adna Hill (1860–1938), American statistician
 Joseph Morrison Hill (1864–1950), American judge
 J. Lister Hill (Joseph Lister Hill, 1894–1984), American politician
 Joseph H. Hill (1858–1927), American educator
 Joseph Hill (musician) (1949–2006), Jamaican vocalist and songwriter
 Joseph Hill (cricketer) (born 1976), New Zealand cricketer
 Joseph Hill, fictional character on the TV series Blue Bloods

See also 
 Joe Hill (disambiguation)
 Hill (surname)